Mahsun Kırmızıgül (born Abdullah Bazencir, March 26, 1969) is a singer songwriter, actor and director, scriptwriter, music composer, producer of Zaza descent. Mahsun Kırmızıgül is also known as a businessman for his partnership in one of the leading music production companies, Prestij Müzik, in Turkey until 2002.

Life
He was born on March 26, 1969 in Diyarbakir, Turkey as a member of a Zaza family of 22 children. He studied primary and secondary schools in Diyarbakir. He worked to contribute his family since his early ages. He started to sing for the weddings to save money. In 1984, he was invited to Istanbul to make an album for 'Güneş Plak'. He started to study in the Voice Department of Istanbul University-Turkish Music Conservatory. Mahsun Kırmızıgül started his music studies in 1980 and made 8 amateur albums. His professional debut album "Alem Buysa Kral Sensin" was dropped in 1993 as a bomb in the music world and sat at the top of the music lists. In 1994, he joined Prestige Music Company as a producer. The artist won the acclaim with his film 'Beyaz Melek' which he wrote, directed and played. In 2009, he released Güneşi Gördüm which he wrote, directed and played. In 2010, he released New York'ta Beş Minare which he wrote, directed, played and composed film's music.

Discography
Studio albums
 Bu da Yeter (1984) Güneş Plak
 Yürek Yarası (1985) Güneş Plak
 Terkedildim (21 November 1986) Güneş Plak
 Sarışınım (8 June 1987) Güneş Plak
 Paylaşamam (22 August 1988) Güneş Plak
 Şimdiki Zaman (15 June 1990) Barış Müzik
 Nilüfer (7 November 1991) Nokta Müzik
 Alem Buysa Kral Sensin (4 February 1993) Nokta Müzik
 12'den Vuracağım (20 September 1994) Prestij Müzik
 Mutlu Ol (1995) Barış Müzik
 Dünden Bugüne (11 January 1995) Güneş Plak
 Acılar İçinde (1995) Destan Müzik
 İstanbul Geceleri (1995) Türküola
 İnsan Hakları (25 October 1995) Kral Müzik - Prestij Müzik
 Sevdalıyım - Hemşerim (2 October 1996) Prestij Müzik
 Nostalji 1 (7 November 1997) Güneş Plak
 Yıkılmadım (3 June 1998) Prestij Müzik
 Yoruldum (30 June 2000) Prestij Müzik
 Ülkem Ağlar (8 August 2001) Prestij Müzik
 Yüzyılın Türküleri (2002) Popüler Müzik - Prestij Müzik
 Sarı Sarı - Başroldeyim (16 April 2004) A1 Müzik
 Dinle (2 June 2006) A1 Müzik
 Hoş Geldin (1 January 2022) A1 Müzik

Compilation albums
 Dünden Bugüne (1995) Günes Plak
 Nostalji 1 (1997) Güneş Plak
 Bir Demet Kırmızıgül (2003) Prestij Müzik

Singles
 İnsan Hakları (1995) Kral Müzik
 Ülkem Ağlar (2001) Prestij Müzik
 Küçük Gelin (2011) A1 Müzik
 Yoksun Sen (2019) A1 Müzik

Filmography

TV series 
 Alem Buysa... (1993)
 Bu Sevda Bitmez (1996)
 Hemşerim (1996)
 Yıkılmadım (1999)
 Zalım (2003)
 Aşka Sürgün (2005) 
 Hayat Devam Ediyor (2011–2013) General Director – Story
 Benim İçin Üzülme (2012) General Director – Story
 Babalar ve Evlatlar (2012) – Story Cinema 
 Yaşamak Haram Oldu (1987)
 Beyaz Melek (2007) as actor, director, scriptwriter.
 Güneşi Gördüm (2009) as actor, director, scriptwriter.
 Gecenin Kanatları (2009) as scriptwriter.
 New York'ta Beş Minare (2010) as actor, director, scriptwriter.
 Mucize (2015) as actor, director, scriptwriter.
 Vezir Parmağı (2017) as actor, director, scriptwriter.
 Mucize 2: Aşk (2019) as actor, director, scriptwriter.

Awards
Kral TV Music Awards 1999
Best male Arabesque singer
Best song
Best selling song
Hürriyet Altın Kelebek 1999
Best musician
Best Selling Album 2006

 References 

 External links 
 Official website
 Short bio
 1999 bio, Hürriyet''

1968 births
Living people
Turkish folk-pop singers
Turkish film directors
Zaza_people
People from  Diyarbakır